Alois Bierl (born 8 September 1943) is a German rower who competed for West Germany in the 1972 Summer Olympics.

He was born in Waldmünchen and member of the Ludwigshafener Ruderverein. He competed at the 1970 World Rowing Championships in St. Catharines in the coxed four and won gold. He competed at the 1971 European Rowing Championships and won a gold medal with the coxed four. In 1972 he was a crew member of the West German boat which won the gold medal in the coxed four event.

References

External links
 

1943 births
Living people
People from Cham (district)
Sportspeople from the Upper Palatinate
Olympic rowers of West Germany
Rowers at the 1972 Summer Olympics
Olympic gold medalists for West Germany
Olympic medalists in rowing
West German male rowers
World Rowing Championships medalists for West Germany
Medalists at the 1972 Summer Olympics
BASF people
European Rowing Championships medalists